Michelle Lintel  (born August 14, 1969) is an American actress and martial artist known for playing the lead role in the 2001 television series Black Scorpion

Filmography
 1999 On Common Ground
 1999 Diagnosis: Murder - "Blood Ties"
 2000 Sacrifice (TV) (as Michele Lintel) as FBI Agent Hildebrandt
 2001 Black Scorpion Detective Darcy Walker / Black Scorpion
 2001 Black Scorpion Returns as Detective Darcy Walker / Black Scorpion
 2001 The X Show Herself (1 episode)
 2002 Sting of the Black Scorpionas  Detective Darcy Walker / Black Scorpion
 2008 The Ex List as Nurse (1 episode)
 2008 Battle Planet as General Shaba

References

External links
Official website

1969 births
Living people
American female taekwondo practitioners
Krav Maga practitioners
American television actresses
Date of birth missing (living people)
Place of birth missing (living people)
21st-century American women